Fred John Weibell (October 18, 1927 – 2015) was an American biomedical engineer.  He served for many years as the Secretary-Treasurer of the Biomedical Engineering Society (BMES).  In 1992, he was the first recipient of the BMES Distinguished Service Award in recognition of his "extraordinary contributions to the Society."

Together with Leslie Cromwell and Erich A. Pfieffer, he was a coauthor of Biomedical Instrumentation and Measurements (Prentice Hall ).  For several decades, this text has been "considered by many to be the 'Bible' for biomedical technicians," and is still used in the curriculum of colleges and universities worldwide.

He died August 6, 2015 from causes incident to age and Parkinson's disease.

References

1927 births
University of Utah alumni
Scientists from Salt Lake City
University of California, Los Angeles alumni
2015 deaths
American biomedical engineers